The 1953–54 Panhellenic Championship was the 18th season of the highest football league of Greece. There was an important innovation, as in its final phase, teams from the Greek region participated in a single group for the first time, bypassing the "Athens - Piraeus - Thessaloniki" triptych. The opportunity to claim the title of champion of a provincial team, was given for the first time in the period 1938-39, but where the championship was held in 2 groups.  Olympiacos won their 10th championship being unbeaten for the 5th time in their history.

The 6 clubs that participated in the final stage were as follows:
Athenian Championship: The first 2 teams of the ranking.
Piraeus' Championship: The champion.
Macedonian Championship: The champion.
Regional Championships: The 2 winners (Northern and Southern group).

The qualifying round matches took place from 10 October 1953 to 31 March 1954, while the final phase took place from 4 April to 21 July 1954. The point system was: Win: 3 points - Draw: 2 points - Loss: 1 point.

Qualification round

Athens Football Clubs Association

Piraeus Football Clubs Association

Macedonia Football Clubs Association

Regional Championship

Southern Group

Northern Group

The Thrace champion did not participate due to delay in the completion of the championship.

Final round

League table

Top scorers

References

External links
Rsssf, 1953-54 championship

Panhellenic Championship seasons
1953–54 in Greek football
Greek